Streptoduocin is an aminoglycoside antibiotic.

It is a mixture of streptomycin and dihydrostreptomycin.

References

Further reading
 
 
 
 
 

Aminoglycoside antibiotics
Combination antibiotics